"Insane" is a song by British band Texas and was the fifth and final single to be released from their fourth studio album White on Blonde. It was released as a double A-side with "Say What You Want (All Day, Every Day)" in 1998. The song was later included on their 2000 compilation album The Greatest Hits.

Track listings
 UK CD1 
 "Insane" – 4:45
 "Say What You Want (All Day, Every Day)" – 4:06
 "Polo Mint City" (full version) – 2:50
 "Say What You Want (All Day, Every Day)" (Trailermen mix) – 8:38

 UK CD2 
 "Say What You Want (All Day, Every Day)" (extended version) – 5:02
 "Insane" (The Second Scroll) – 6:33
 "Say What You Want (All Day, Every Day)" (RZA instrumental) – 5:13
 "Insane" (The Second Scroll dub) – 6:35

 UK cassette single 
 "Say What You Want (All Day, Every Day)" – 4:06
 "Insane" – 4:45

Charts
All entries charted as a double A-side with "Say What You Want (All Day, Every Day)".

References

Texas (band) songs
1998 singles
Song recordings produced by Mike Hedges
Songs written by Johnny McElhone
Songs written by Sharleen Spiteri